Shigony may refer to any of the following rural localities in Russia:

Shigony, a rural village in the Shigonsky District of Samara Oblast
 a railway station near said village